Unione Calcio AlbinoLeffe is an Italian association football club representing Albino and Leffe, two small towns located in Val Seriana, Lombardy. The club played in Serie B for nine consecutive years and narrowly missed promotion in Serie A at the end of the 2007–08 season. It currently plays in Serie C and has been in the Italian third tier since its relegation in 2011–12.

History

The club was created in 1998 as a result of the merger between former Serie C2 (fourth division) teams Albinese Calcio and Società Calcio Leffe, respectively from Albino and Leffe, two neighboring towns. In their first season, the club finished 2nd in the Serie C2 and won a promotion having defeated A.C. Prato in the Girone A Play-offs final. After rising to Serie C1 (the Italian third division), they performed at the middle of the pack, finishing 9th in 2000 and 13th in 2001.

However, in 2002, the Seriani went to the finals of the Coppa Italia Serie C, where they defeated Livorno 2–1 at home before losing 2–3 on the road. They won the tournament on the tiebreaker (most away goals scored). In league play they again finished 13th. In 2003, AlbinoLeffe, under coach Elio Gustinetti, finished second in league play before heading to the promotion play-off. There, they defeated Padua in the semifinals, then had a surprising triumph over Pisa Calcio, which pushed them up to Serie B.

The team moved from the small Martinelli Stadium in Leffe, where they used to play home matches before promotion to Serie B, to the bigger Stadio Atleti Azzurri d'Italia located in Bergamo, the chief-town of the province where both Albino and Leffe are located. Even though AlbinoLeffe was considered to be an outsider in Serie B, which historically includes several former Scudetto winners, the team remarkably managed to avoid relegation in the last two seasons. In 2005–2006, after a great comeback in the second half of the season following the appointment of Emiliano Mondonico as new head coach, Albinoleffe ended the season in eighteenth place and managed to save itself from relegation by prevailing in the playouts against Avellino (score: 2–0, 2–3). The 2006–2007 Serie B campaign, the fourth consecutive for the small Lombard team, ended with a good tenth place, well ahead of the relegation zone.

Historically, AlbinoLeffe's home games have been characterized by very low attendance, as shown by the average 2,400 spectators per game in the 2006–07 season, the most successful in the club history.

With local hero Gustinetti back in charge of the team and despite a lineup composed of relative unknowns, the club's 2007–08 campaign started surprisingly well, with the team leading the Serie B table for a few weeks and arousing the interest of the national media, which began providing regular coverage of the team's games. This has thus far failed to improve the club's low home attendance, however. During the season, AlbinoLeffe confirmed as a potential candidate for direct promotion to Serie A, however a string of poor results, ended with four consecutive home defeats, the final one being a 0–4 loss to Rimini, denied them the chance to achieve a place in the top two, and persuaded club chairman Gianfranco Andreoletti to sack Gustinetti, who then confirmed not to be in good relationships with the chairman, and appoint youth team coach Armando Madonna as caretaker boss for the final regular season match and the following promotion playoffs. Even after a 1–0 loss to Brescia, AlbinoLeffe managed to win at home in the second leg (2–1) and qualified for the final against Lecce. In the first leg they suffered a 1–0 loss. On 15 June, the second match was played in Lecce and its result was 1–1, so AlbinoLeffe did not reach Serie A.

At the end of the 2011–12 season, it was relegated to Lega Pro Prima Divisione after 9 consecutive years in Serie B.

AlbinoLeffe following the systematic match fixing as a club controlled by Singapore-based organized crime  was penalized 10 points in the 2012–13 Lega Pro Prima Divisione.

Stadium and colors
From the 2003–04 Serie B season and until 2019, AlbinoLeffe played its home games at the Atleti Azzurri d'Italia stadium in the city of Bergamo. Previously they played in Stadio Carlo Martelli of Leffe.

Following Atalanta's renovation works on the stadium, the club reached a venue sharing agreement with Giana Erminio from the nearby city of Gorgonzola allowing the club to play their home matches for the 2019–20 Serie C season at the Stadio Città di Gorgonzola.

In 2021, the club opened a brand-new stadium in the town of Zanica with a capacity of 1,791 (with possibility of expansion to up to 5,500 in case of a promotion in Serie B) built next to the club's headquarters and training centre; the stadium was formally approved by the Italian National Olympic Committee in March 2019. The stadium makes AlbinoLeffe the first Serie C team to own their home stadium. the inauguration match was played on 21 December 2021, a Serie C league game against Pro Patria.

The club's official colors are dark blue and azure blue, also used for home matches, while the outfit worn by the players for away matches is red and yellow. The official stadium speaker of the club is Simone Altrocchi.

Honours

Domestic
Coppa Italia Serie C
Winners (1): 2001–02
Serie B
Play-off Finals: 2007–08
Serie C1
Runners-up (1): 2002–03
Serie C2
Runners-up (1): 1998-1999

Players

Current squad

Club officials

Board of directors

 Last updated: 2 February 2022
 Source:Board of directors

Current technical staff

 Last updated: 2 February 2022
 Source:Technical staff

Seasons

Notable former players
The footballers enlisted below have had international cap(s) for their respective countries at junior and/or senior level and/or a significant number of caps and goals accumulated throughout a certain number of seasons for U.C. AlbinoLeffe.

  Andrea Belotti
  Alessandro Diamanti
  Federico Marchetti
  Federico Peluso
  Marco Sau
  Kewullay Conteh
  Karamoko Cissé
  Mehmet Hetemaj
  Sergejs Vorobjovs
  Mirco Poloni
  Ivan Del Prato
  Pierre Regonesi
  Ruben Garlini
  Damiano Sonzogni
  Roberto Bonazzi
  Marco Cellini
  Francesco Ruopolo
  Christian Araboni
  Filippo Carobbio
  Roberto Previtali
  Alessandro Salvi
  Andrea Soncin
  Fabio Gavazzi

Notable former managers

  Elio Gustinetti
  Emiliano Mondonico
  Armando Madonna
  Massimiliano Alvini
  Marco Zaffaroni

References

External links
Official Website 

 
Football clubs in Lombardy
Association football clubs established in 1998
Serie B clubs
Serie C clubs
Sport in the Province of Bergamo
1998 establishments in Italy
Coppa Italia Serie C winning clubs